Canaan Township may refer to the following townships in the United States:
 Canaan Township, Henry County, Iowa
 Canaan Township, Gasconade County, Missouri (inactive)
 Canaan Township, Athens County, Ohio
 Canaan Township, Madison County, Ohio
 Canaan Township, Morrow County, Ohio
 Canaan Township, Wayne County, Ohio
 Canaan Township, Wayne County, Pennsylvania

See also 
 South Canaan Township, Wayne County, Pennsylvania